Khub Ram is an Indian politician. He was member of the Bharatiya Janata Party. Ram was a member of the Himachal Pradesh Legislative Assembly from the Anni constituency in Kullu district. Later, he joined Indian National Congress ahead of 2012 Himachal Pradesh Legislative Assembly election.

References 

People from Kullu district
Bharatiya Janata Party politicians from Himachal Pradesh
Living people
Himachal Pradesh MLAs 1982–1985
Himachal Pradesh MLAs 1990–1992
Himachal Pradesh MLAs 2012–2017
Indian National Congress politicians from Himachal Pradesh
Year of birth missing (living people)